The Joseph Kronser Hotel and Saloon of Greenville, Wisconsin, United States, was built in 1897. The hotel and saloon also were primarily intended for railroad travelers along the adjacent Chicago and North Western Railway line. The hotel had five rooms available and also housed the ticket office for the railroad. The building also featured the first post office in town until the 1940s, a barbershop from the 1940s to 1968 and a gas station after 1929.

The building was added to the National Register of Historic Places in 1988 as well as the State Register of Historic Places in 1989 for its significance in architecture and to the development of Greenville.

References

Vernacular architecture in Wisconsin
National Register of Historic Places in Outagamie County, Wisconsin
1897 establishments in Wisconsin
Former railway stations in Wisconsin
Railway stations on the National Register of Historic Places in Wisconsin
Railway stations in the United States opened in 1897
Former Chicago and North Western Railway stations
Hotel buildings on the National Register of Historic Places in Wisconsin
Railway hotels in the United States
Hotel buildings completed in 1897